The Hare & Hounds is a public house on the High Street in the Kings Heath area of Birmingham, England. Originally built in 1820 and remodelled to its current form in 1907, the Hare & Hounds is Grade II listed, as it retained many original Art Nouveau internal fixtures.

The Hare & Hounds has hosted many up-and-coming artists early in their careers, including Ed Sheeran, Ellie Goulding, and Basement Jaxx. The pub is best known for being the location of reggae and pop band UB40's first gig in 1979. In 2011, to commemorate the occasion, a PRS For Music Heritage Award plaque was unveiled. In 2016, the Hare & Hounds won the Best Live Entertainment award at the Great British Pub Awards.

References 

Grade II listed pubs in Birmingham